Haines Seaplane Base  is a public-use seaplane base located in Haines, Alaska. It is owned by Haines Borough. It is included in the National Plan of Integrated Airport Systems for 2011–2015, which categorized it as a general aviation facility.

Facilities and aircraft 
Haines Seaplane Base has one seaplane landing area designated N/S which measures 5,000 by 4,000 feet (1,524 x 1,219 m). For the 12-month period ending December 31, 2006, the airport had 250 aircraft operations, an average of 20 per month: 60% general aviation and 40% air taxi.

See also 
 Haines Airport
 List of airports in Alaska

References

External links 
 FAA Alaska airport diagram (GIF)
 Topographic map from USGS The National Map

Airports in Haines Borough, Alaska
Seaplane bases in Alaska